Nucras is a genus of African lacertid lizards, commonly called sandveld lizards.

Species
The following 13 species are recognized as being valid.
Nucras aurantiaca 
Nucras boulengeri  - Uganda savannah lizard, Boulenger's scrub lizard
Nucras broadleyi  - Angolan sandveld lizard
Nucras caesicaudata  - bluetailed sandveld lizard, bluetail scrub lizard
Nucras damarana 
Nucras holubi  - Holub's sandveld lizard 
Nucras intertexta  - spotted sandveld lizard
Nucras lalandii  - Delalande's sandveld lizard, Laland's lizard, Delalande's spotted lizard
Nucras livida  - Karoo sandveld lizard
Nucras ornata  - ornate sandveld lizard, ornate scrub lizard
Nucras scalaris  - scaled sandveld lizard
Nucras taeniolata  - Albany sandveld lizard, striped scrub lizard
Nucras tessellata  - western sandveld lizard, striped sandveld lizard, tiger lizard, striped sand lizard, banded sand lizard

Nota bene: A binomial authority in parentheses indicates that the species was originally described in a genus other than Nucras.

References

Further reading
Bischoff W (1991). "Übersicht der Arten und Unterarten der Familie Lacertidae 4. Die Gattungen Latastia, Meroles, Nucras, Ophisops, Pedioplanis und Philocortus". Die Eidechse 2 (4): 17–25. (in German).
Gray JE (1845). Catalogue of the Specimens of Lizards in the Collection of the British Museum. London: Trustees of the British Museum. (Edward Newman, printer). xxviii + 289 pp. (Nucras, new genus, p. 33).

 
Lizard genera
Taxa named by John Edward Gray